Jacques d'Amboise may refer to:
* Jacques d'Amboise (doctor) (1559–1606), French doctor and surgeon
 Jacques d'Amboise (bishop) ( – 1516), French religious dignitary and patron of medieval France
 Jacques d'Amboise (dancer) (1934–2021), American ballet dancer and choreographer